Villenouvelle is a commune in the Haute-Garonne department in southwestern France. Villenouvelle station has rail connections to Toulouse, Carcassonne and Narbonne.

Population

See also 

 Communes of the Haute-Garonne department

References

Communes of Haute-Garonne